Arthur James may refer to:

 Arthur James (footballer) (1855–1911), English footballer
 Arthur James (judge) (1916–1976), English Court of Appeal judge
 Arthur James (politician) (1883–1973), Governor of Pennsylvania
 Arthur James (racehorse owner) (1853–1917), British racehorse owner
 Arthur G. James (1912–2001), American surgeon
 Arthur Lorne James (1903–1964), Air Vice-Marshal in the Royal Canadian Air Force
 Arthur Curtiss James (1867–1941), speculator in copper mines and railroads
 Arthur Walter James (1912–2015), British journalist and politician
 Arthur Lloyd James (1884–1943), Welsh phonetician 
 Art James (baseball) (born 1952), American MLB outfielder
 Art James (1929–2004), American television personality
 Jimmy Griffin (1943–2005), a.k.a. Arthur James, American songwriter

See also
 James Arthur (disambiguation)
Arthur James Balfour